KPTZ (91.9 FM) is a non-commercial, educational radio station. KPTZ is on the air 24 hours a day with locally produced programming filled by music automation. KPTZ will broadcast a mix of locally originated programming featuring area people, art, activities and news. Licensed to Port Townsend, Washington, United States, the station serves the Northwest Washington area.  The station is currently owned by Radio Port Townsend.

Hosts and Programs
Sheila Bender, In Conversation
Phil Andrus, Cats in Our Laps
Tigran Arakelyan, Exploring Music

References

External links

PTZ
Radio stations established in 2011
Companies based in Port Townsend, Washington